The Cocoa Mets were a minor league baseball team based in Cocoa, Florida in 1964. The Cocoa Mets played exclusively as members of the four–team Rookie level Cocoa Rookie League, placing 2nd in the league standings, with all league games played at the Cocoa Expo Sports Center. The Cocoa Mets were a minor league affiliate of the New York Mets in 1964.

History
The Cocoa Rookie League began play in the 1964 season, with all games based in Cocoa, Florida. The Cocoa "Mets" became members of the four–team Rookie level Cocoa Rookie League. The Cocoa Colts, Cocoa Tigers and Melbourne Twins joined the Mets in the four–team league, beginning play on July 1, 1964.

On July 3, 1964, Cocoa Met pitcher Tug McGraw threw a 7–inning no-hitter in his professional debut. McGraw defeated the Cocoa Colts 4–0 in the victory.

In their only season of play, the Cocoa Mets placed second in the Cocoa Rookie League final standings. With a record of 28–22, playing under manager Ken Deal, the Mets finished 5.0 games the first place Melbourne Twins (34–18) in the final regular season standings. Cocoa Met player Al Yates led the Cocoa Rookie League with 31 RBI, while Yates and teammate John Agnetti tied with Gerald Lyscio of the Twins for the league lead with 2 home runs each.

The complex–based Mets and other Cocoa Rookie League teams charged fans no admission to games and individual attendance records were not kept, as the league drew a total of 1,683 fans for the season.

The Cocoa Rookie League did not return to play in 1965. The next season, Cocoa, Florida hosted the Cocoa Astros, who began play as members of the 1965  Class A level Florida State League.

The ballparks
The Cocoa Rookie League teams played games at the Cocoa Expo Sports Center.

Year–by–year records

Notable alumni

Jim Bethke (1964)
Kevin Collins (1964)
Ken Deal (1964, MGR)
Tug McGraw (1964) New York Mets Hall of Fame
Al Yates (1964)

See also
Cocoa Rookie League Mets players

References

External references
Cocoa - Baseball Reference

Defunct minor league baseball teams
Baseball teams established in 1964
Baseball teams disestablished in 1964
Defunct baseball teams in Florida
New York Mets minor league affiliates
Cocoa, Florida